Keith Anderson Hope Murray, Baron Murray of Newhaven, KCB (28 July 1903 – 10 October 1993) was a British academic and Rector of Lincoln College, Oxford.

Early life
He was the son of Lord Murray, a Senator of the College of Justice, and his wife Annie Florence Nicolson.

Educated at Edinburgh Academy and the University of Edinburgh where he gained a BSc in Agriculture, Murray went into employment with the Ministry of Agriculture from 1925 to 1926. He was then awarded a Commonwealth Fund Fellowship, and spent three years at Cornell University where he was awarded a PhD.

In 1929 he attended Oriel College, Oxford, and the Agricultural Economics Research Institute (AERI) until 1932.

He died on 10 October 1993 and is buried with his parents and siblings in Warriston Cemetery in north Edinburgh.

Career
He became a Research Officer for the AERI, a post he held until 1944. In 1937, however, he was appointed a Fellow and Bursar of Lincoln College, Oxford, as well as being appointed by the University to Oxford City Council. On the death of the Rector J. A. R. Munro in 1944, he was elected to the Rectorship, a position he held until his retirement in 1953. He became the first Rector since Nathaniel Crew not to die in office.

On his retirement from the Rectorship, Rab Butler, the then-Chancellor of the Exchequer, appointed him Chairman of the University Grants Committee, a post he held for a decade.

In 1957, Sir Robert Menzies, the Australian Prime Minister, asked him to serve on the Committee on Australian Universities. He was appointed a Knight Commander of the Order of the Bath (KCB) in the 1963 New Year Honours. He was Vice President of Wellington College (1966–69), Honorary President of the National Union of Students (1967–70).

He was Chairman of the Committee of Enquiry into the Governance of the University of London (1970–72) which produced the Murray Report. This led to the merger of several of the constituent colleges of the university such as Royal Holloway College and Bedford College under the leadership of their principals Dr Roy Miller and Professor Dorothy Wedderburn.

He was Chancellor of Southampton University from 1964 to 1974.

He was Chairman of the Royal Commission for the Exhibition of 1851 (1962–71).

He held Honorary Fellowships of Downing College, Cambridge, Oriel College, Oxford, Birkbeck College, London, and Lincoln College, Oxford. On 17 September 1964, he was created a life peer as Baron Murray of Newhaven, of Newhaven in the County and City of Edinburgh.

The Keith Murray Senior Scholarship at Lincoln College is named in his memory.

Lightfoot Scholar in Ecclesiastical History, University of Cambridge, 1938; Thirlwall Prize and Medal 1941.

Formerly Lecturer in Mathematics, King's College, Newcastle; Senior Mathematics and Johnson University
Scholar 1954.
 
Formerly Fellow of Emmanuel College, Cambridge.

Professor of Philosophy, University of Canterbury, New Zealand, 1959-69.

Formerly MRC Staff Scientist, MRC Neurochemical Pharmacology Unit, Cambridge.

Formerly Lecturer in Law, Nottingham University.

Formerly MRC Staff Member, MRC Laboratory of Molecular Biology, Cambridge.

Amory Houghton Professor of Chemistry, Harvard University, since 1974.

Hulsean Lecturer, University of Cambridge, 1981-2.

Formerly Vinerian Professor of English Law and Fellow of All Souls; Vinerian Scholar 1921; Rhodes Travelling Fellow 1931.

Chancellor, University of Southampton; formerly Bursar (1937–53) and Rector (1944–53); formerly Chairman of the University Grants Committee; Hon. Fellow of Downing College, Cambridge; Commonwealth Fund Fellow 1926-9; Hon. DCL.

Hon. ARIBA; Member Royal Fine Art Commission; Trustee, National Gallery; Trustee, Tate Gallery; Hon. D.Litt.

Professor of Economics at Harvard; Hon. D.Litt. Williams College.

Vice-Chancellor 1977-81; Formerly Dr Lee's Professor of Chemistry and Fellow of Exeter College.

Professor of Physics, University of Bristol.

High Master St Paul's School 1939-46;

Headmaster of Winchester College 1946-53;

Pilgrim Trustee;

Hon. LLD St And.

Sometime Director, National Institute of Health, Bethesda;

Hon. D.Sc. College of William and Mary, Albany Medical College of Union University, Hahnemann Medical College.

Honoured at Pembroke College, Oxford in Sir Geoffrey Arthur Building with room named for him for Cornell/Pembroke relations.

Arms

References

1903 births
1993 deaths
People educated at Edinburgh Academy
Alumni of the University of Edinburgh
Cornell University alumni
Fellows of Downing College, Cambridge
Fellows of Lincoln College, Oxford
Fellows of Oriel College, Oxford
Harkness Fellows
Knights Commander of the Order of the Bath
Life peers
Rectors of Lincoln College, Oxford
People associated with Birkbeck, University of London
Chancellors of the University of Southampton
Life peers created by Elizabeth II